John Leopold may refer to,
John R. Leopold (born 1943), American politician in Maryland
John L. Leopold (born 1965), American politician in Santa Cruz County, California

See also
Johann Leopold (disambiguation)